Alan Sader (born February 12, 1940) is an American TV, film, and stage actor. He is perhaps best known for being the television spokesperson for ChildFund International (formerly Christian Children's Fund), an international child sponsorship charity, a post he has held since 1992.

From 1972 to 1982, he was an owner/producer of Tidewater Dinner Theater in Norfolk, Virginia.

Major films include The Prince of Tides (1991) and Evan Almighty (2007).

Sader has appeared in numerous television shows such as Dawson's Creek, Legacy and Matlock. Locally in Virginia, Sader has also appeared in TV commercials for companies such as Farm Fresh Supermarkets and Haynes Furniture.

As of 2018, he lives in Richmond, Virginia, where he remains active in acting.

Filmography

 Finnegan Begin Again (1985) – Convention Drunk
 Marie: A True Story (1985) – Professor
 King Kong Lives (1986) – 1st Faculty Doctor
 CBS Schoolbreak Special (TV), episode "Never Say Goodbye" (1988) – Dr. Hildebrand
 Lincoln (aka Gore Vidal's Lincoln, 1988 TV miniseries) – Sickles
 The Ryan White Story (TV, 1989) – Reverend Williams
 Unspeakable Acts (1990) – Judge Newman
 Nightmare in Columbia County (alternate title: Victim of Beauty: The Dawn Smith Story — TV, 1991) – Prosecutor
 The Prince Of Tides (1991) – Spencer Richardson
 Labor of Love: The Arlette Schweitzer Story (1993) – Dr. Howard Gilroy
 CBS Schoolbreak Special (TV), episode "If I Die Before I Wake" (1993) – Minister
 Taking Liberty (1993)
 Bionic Ever After? (1994) – John MacNamara
 Assault at West Point: The Court-Martial of Johnson Whittaker (1994) – Colonel Lugenbeel
 Murderous Intent (1995) – Dr. Halprin 
 Tad (TV film about Tad Lincoln, 1995) – Cameron
 Twisted Desire (1996) – Judge
 Spirit Lost (1997) - Randolph Smythe
 Stonebrook (1999) – Mathis
 Something the Lord Made (2004) – Hecker's Crony
 Evan Almighty (2007) – Congressperson 
 Lincoln (2012 film directed by Steven Spielberg) – Sergeant-at-Arms

Awards
 Best Actor, Richmond Theatre Critics' Circle Awards, King Lear, Quill Theatre – Richmond Shakespeare Festival, 2011.

References

External links
 
 Alan Sader movie filmography at Turner Classic Movies

1940 births
American television personalities
American male film actors
American male stage actors
People from Virginia
Living people
American male voice actors
20th-century American male actors
21st-century American male actors
Actors from Virginia